E12 or E-12  may refer to:

Science, technology and mathematics
 the E12 series of preferred numbers
 E12 screw, a type of Edison screw
 the code name for Microsoft Exchange Server 2007
 Siding Spring Survey code

Transport

Roads and trails
 European route E12
 E12 European long distance path
 Ampang–Kuala Lumpur Elevated Highway (AKLEH), a fully elevated expressway in Kuala Lumpur, Malaysia

Vehicles
 BMW E12
 HMS E12, a United Kingdom Royal Navy submarine which saw service during World War I
 Spyker E12, a Dutch Spyker car

Other uses
 Queen's Indian Defense, Encyclopaedia of Chess Openings code
 E12, a postcode district in the E postcode area
 E-12 equal temperament consisting of twelve equal semitones per octave